WVCD (790 kHz) is a non-commercial AM radio station licensed to both Bamberg, South Carolina and Denmark, South Carolina.  The station is owned by historically black Voorhees College.  The college is affiliated with the Episcopal Church and has its campus in Denmark, SC.  WVCD is partially run by students and has a radio format which includes urban contemporary, urban gospel and Christian talk and teaching programs.

By day, WVCD is powered at 1,000 watts. But to reduce interference to other stations on 790 AM, at night, it reduces power to 100 watts.  It uses a non-directional antenna at all times.

History
The station went on the air as WRIT on 1993-03-15. On 2004-01-30, the station changed its call sign to the current WVCD.

References

External links

VCD
Radio stations established in 1993
1993 establishments in South Carolina